Latchingdon is a village situated in the Dengie Peninsula in Essex, England, south of the city of Chelmsford. The parish was at one time called Latchingdon-cum-Snoreham, and Snoreham Hall still exists to the south of Latchingdon.

The place-name 'Latchingdon' is first attested in 1065 in a charter later published in the Diplomatarium anglicum edited by Benjamin Thorpe, where it appears as Laecedune. It appears in the Domesday Book of 1086 as Lacenduna, Lachenduna and Lessenduna. The name may derive from an unrecorded Old English word *læcce from the verb læccan to catch, meaning a trap, and related to the modern word 'latch'. The name would then mean 'hill with a trap', presumably to catch animals.

Churches
The village's Christ Church, built in 1857, features an Essex bell-cote.

St Michael's Church was built in late 13th Century, but its use was limited once Christ Church was built in the centre of the village due to increasing population, being kept as a mortuary chapel until it was deconsecrated in the late 1950s.  In 1968 it was named as the first of 100 Essex churches to be disposed of by the Church of England.  In 1976 it was converted to a private house.

A Congregational Church was also built in the village, but it closed and is now a private house.

Latchingdon and Snoreham Poor
Under the Poor Law of 1834, Latchingdon and Snoreham became part of the Maldon Union.

Parish Council
Latchingdon Parish Council meets monthly at Latchingdon village hall.

References

External links

Latchingdon Residents Association
Information and pictures of Latchingdon village
History of Latchingdon 

Villages in Essex
Maldon District